The Brownsville–Harlingen–Raymondville combined statistical area is made up of two counties in the Rio Grande Valley region of Texas. The CSA consists of the Brownsville–Harlingen metropolitan statistical area and the Raymondville micropolitan statistical area. A 2013 census estimate puts its population at 439,197.

Counties
 Cameron
 Willacy

Communities

Cities
 Brownsville (principal city)
 Harlingen (principal city)
 La Feria
 Los Fresnos
 Lyford
 Palm Valley
 Port Isabel
 Raymondville (principal city)
 Rio Hondo
 San Benito
 San Perlita

Towns
 Bayview
 Combes
 Indian Lake
 Laguna Vista
 Los Indios
 Primera
 Rancho Viejo
 Santa Rosa
 South Padre Island

Villages
 Rangerville

Census-designated places

Demographics
At the 2010 census,  428,354 people, 102,851 households and 84,537 families were residing within the CSA. The racial makeup of the CSA was 79.73% White, 0.58% African American, 0.44% Native American, 0.46% Asian, 16.49% from other races, and 2.30% from two or more races. Hispanics or Latinos of any race were 84.42% of the population.

The median household income was $24,135, and the median family income was $26,465. Males had a median income of $21,231 versus $16,848 for females. The per capita income for the CSA was $10,191.

See also
 List of cities in Texas
 Texas census statistical areas
 List of Texas metropolitan areas

References

Geography of Cameron County, Texas
Geography of Willacy County, Texas
Combined statistical areas of the United States